Ewald Hasler (3 August 1932 – 7 April 2013) was a Liechtenstein cyclist. He competed in the individual road race event at the 1952 Summer Olympics where he ranked 43rd out of 111 participants.

References

External links
 

1932 births
2013 deaths
Liechtenstein male cyclists
Olympic cyclists of Liechtenstein
Cyclists at the 1952 Summer Olympics